Awantura o kasę (Brawl about money) was a Polish game show hosted by Krzysztof Ibisz. It aired from November 4, 2002 to February 25, 2005 on the Polish station Polsat. In 2005 ATM Grupa sold a license of the format to New Zealand using the title Cash Battle.

Rules

Round 1 

Three teams compete: blue, green and yellow. Each team started the game with 5,000 zł. They bid on questions coming from categories chosen by a wheel spun by the host. The team that gave the highest amount of money to the pool answered the question. If their answer was correct – they took money from the pool; if they were wrong – the pool carried over to the next question.  After six questions, the richest team moved to the second round.  (If the last question was answered incorrectly, the team with the highest total automatically won the pool.)  Each auction always began with 200 zloty being deducted from the team bank account to start with, and the teams began bidding from there.

A team automatically answered the question if they bet their entire bank account ("va banque"), or if their bid was higher than another team's total in their bank account.

A team who bid everything and answered a question wrong was automatically eliminated from the game.  In the event this only left one team, the winning team automatically took all the money in the pool.

The New Zealand version used orange instead of yellow to mark the third team.

Audio/Video 

Some questions include audio and video clips to accompany the question.

End of Round 

All teams go home with any money in their bank account if they have any money.

If there is a tie between the lead, the tie is broken with a 1-on-1 duel.

Round 2 

The team that won the first round and the team that won the prior episode (known as Champions) played using similar rules. The challenging team began the round with the money they won in round 1, while the Champions team began with the score that won first round on the first episode they appeared in. The team with the highest score won the game and would play in next episode as Champions. They remained on the show until they were defeated. If round 2 ended with a tie, the win went to the Champions.

Passing of the Hats 

The Champions team always wore traditional graduation cap and gown outfits. When a challenging team won a match, the departing Champions traditionally took off their hats and placed them on the heads of the new Champions.

Categories

Hint 

It includes 4 possible variants of answers, of which 1 is correct. After choosing category "Hint", hint can be bought on auction (but unlike other auctions, money bid by teams is removed from play instead of being added to the pool).

The team that won the hint via the auction was allowed to call for it at any point, even during further episodes. A hint can also be bought after reading the question for price given by the host (bargaining allowed). The team that wants to buy the hint or use one bought earlier, they must ask for it before their minute to answer the question expires (once it does the host prompts the team for an immediate answer). During bargaining timer is stopped. If the host approves the price, he reads the four choices and the minute-long timer restarts, but if the hint is not bought, it resumes from the moment it stopped at.

1 vs 1 

This phase involves one player from each team. They choose the category by taking turns eliminating categories from the list. After reading a question, the first to press the button answers the question. If they answer correctly, the team wins 1,000 zloty (500 from each team), while the opponent is eliminated (goes to the "dugout"), and the losing team plays shorthanded. In case of a wrong answer, the answering player goes to the dugout, and the pool carries over to the next question. If neither player presses button within a minute, both of them are eliminated, and the pool carries over to the next question.

A player in the dugout can be bought out in any moment by their team via bargaining with the host (in a way similar to asking for a hint).

Black box 

Inside the black box can be anything - cash, cars, airline tickets or even joke prizes such as pickles.  The money can be a large amount such as 10,000 zloty, all the way down to just 1 zloty (referred to by the host as a "symbolic buck").  The teams hold an auction for it in the event the host's wheel stops on the space. Like during a hint auction, money bid by teams is removed from play. There were cases of going all-in, which meant forfeiting game for the Box.

The contents of the black box are revealed at the end of the show (therefore after determining a winner of the episode).  If the Black Box has cash, the cash is added to the team's cumulative total, but prizes are not mentioned in the total (i.e., a team's winnings might be spoken as "76,500 zloty in cash plus 1 automobile.").

Notes 
Since the first episode didn't have a proper returning champion, the Champions team was made up of previous jackpot winners from the previous game show Życiowa szansa (the Polish version of the then-popular international game show It's Your Chance of a Lifetime, also hosted by Krzysztof Ibisz).  Clips from that show were played during the player introductions, as well as showing the grand total amounts won.

Krzysztof Ibisz is also credited with calling the show "the most unpredictable game show in Poland."

Channels

References

Polish television series
2002 Polish television series debuts
2005 Polish television series endings
2000s Polish television series
Polsat original programming
Polish game shows